Rapha may refer to:
Rapha, a minor biblical character mentioned in the Septuagint version of the Bible
Rapha–Gitane–Dunlop, a French professional cycling team that existed from 1959 to 1961
Rapha (sportswear), a sportswear brand
Rapha (video gamer), the pseudonym of the professional electronic sports player Shane Hendrixson